Gurgen-Khachik Artsruni (died 1003) was the fifth King of Vaspurakan, from the Artsruni dynasty. On the death of his father Abusahl-Hamazasp in 968/969, the kingdom was divided among his three sons, and Ashot-Sahak, as the eldest, retained the royal title and the suzerainty over his younger brothers. On Ashot's death, Gurgen usurped the throne from Ashot's sons and reigned as king until his own death in 1003. He was succeeded as king by his brother Seneqerim-Hovhannes.

1003 deaths
10th-century monarchs of Vaspurakan
11th-century monarchs in Asia
Artsruni dynasty
Year of birth unknown
10th-century Armenian people
11th-century Armenian people